In physics, mainly quantum mechanics and particle physics, a spin magnetic moment is the magnetic moment caused by the spin of elementary particles. For example, the electron is an elementary spin-1/2 fermion. Quantum electrodynamics gives the most accurate prediction of the anomalous magnetic moment of the electron.

In general, a magnetic moment can be defined in terms of an electric current and the area enclosed by the current loop. Since angular momentum corresponds to rotational motion, the magnetic moment can be related to the orbital angular momentum of the charge carriers in the constituting current. However, in magnetic materials, the atomic and molecular dipoles have magnetic moments not just because of their quantized orbital angular momentum, but also due to the spin of elementary particles constituting them.

"Spin" is a non-classical property of elementary particles, since classically the "spin angular momentum" of a material object is really just the total orbital angular momenta of the object's constituents about the rotation axis. Elementary particles are conceived as point objects with no axis around which to "spin" (see wave–particle duality).

History
The idea of a spin angular momentum was first proposed in a 1925 publication by George Uhlenbeck and Samuel Goudsmit to explain hyperfine splitting in atomic spectra. In 1928, Paul Dirac provided a rigorous theoretical foundation for the concept in the Dirac equation for the wavefunction of the electron.

Spin in chemistry

Spin magnetic moments create a basis for one of the most important principles in chemistry, the Pauli exclusion principle. This principle, first suggested by Wolfgang Pauli, governs most of modern-day chemistry. The theory plays further roles than just the explanations of doublets within electromagnetic spectrum. This additional quantum number, spin, became the basis for the modern standard model used today, which includes the use of Hund's rules, and an explanation of beta decay.

Calculation
We can calculate the observable spin magnetic moment, a vector, for a sub-atomic particle with mass m, and spin angular momentum (also a vector), via:

where  is the gyromagnetic ratio, e is the elementary charge unit, g is a dimensionless number, called the g-factor,  and m is the mass. Even though the neutron has a charge , its quarks give it a magnetic moment.

The intrinsic electron magnetic dipole moment is approximately equal to the Bohr magneton μ because  and the electron's spin is also :

Equation is therefore normally written as:

Just like the total spin angular momentum cannot be measured, neither can the total spin magnetic moment be measured. Equations,, give the physical observable, that component of the magnetic moment measured along an axis, relative to or along the applied field direction. Assuming a Cartesian coordinate system, conventionally, the z-axis is chosen but the observable values of the component of spin angular momentum along all three axes are each ±. However, in order to obtain the magnitude of the total spin angular momentum,  be replaced by its eigenvalue,  where s is the spin quantum number. In turn, calculation of the magnitude of the total spin magnetic moment requires that be replaced by:

The analysis is readily extended to the spin-only magnetic moment of an atom. For example, the total spin magnetic moment (sometimes referred to as the effective magnetic moment when the orbital moment contribution to the total magnetic moment is neglected) of a transition metal ion with a single d shell electron outside of closed shells (e.g. Titanium Ti) is 1.73 μ since  while an atom with two unpaired electrons (e.g. Vanadium V with  would have an effective magnetic moment of

See also
Nuclear magneton
Pauli exclusion principle
Nuclear magnetic resonance
Multipole expansion
Relativistic quantum mechanics
Magnetic spin vortex disc

Footnotes

References

Selected books

Hans Kopfermann Kernmomente and ''Nuclear Momenta (Akademische Verl., 1940, 1956, and Academic Press, 1958)

Selected papers

External links
 An Introduction to the Electronic Structure of Atoms and Molecules by Dr. Richard F.W. Bader (McMaster University)

Magnetic moment
Magnetism
Rotational symmetry
Spintronics